Violet Chachki is the stage name of Paul Jason Dardo (born June 13, 1992), an American drag queen, burlesque/aerial performer, content creator, model, and recording artist best known for winning the seventh season of RuPaul's Drag Race. Chachki is genderfluid and uses she/her and they/them pronouns.

Career
Dardo began performing in drag as Violet Chachki at the age of 19. The name "Violet" was inspired by Jennifer Tilly's character of the same name in the film Bound, while "Chachki" is a variant of the Yiddish word tchotchke, used to name a strictly decorative small collectible item or describe a beautiful young lady. She first performed at the bar LeBuzz in Marietta, Georgia. Using a fake ID to perform in local drag shows, she eventually won Miss New Faces at Friends on Ponce in Atlanta and was adopted as a "drag daughter" by drag queens Dax Exclamationpoint (who competed on the eighth season of Drag Race) and Genre Monster. Later, Chachki was enrolled at the Savannah College of Art and Design at the Atlanta campus for fashion design, but dropped out to focus on doing drag. She became a regular cast member of The Other Show at the bar Jungle in Atlanta which gave her exposure locally and allowed her to perform with Alaska Thunderfuck 5000, Amanda Lepore, and Lady Bunny.

In 2013, she was photographed for "Legendary Children". The project focused on Atlanta's drag scene and was exhibited at Gallery 1526. Two photos that featured her genitals and gaff  were covered up after complaints. Later, the censorship controversy caught the attention of Vice.

In 2014, she appeared on the cover for the single "Cosplay" by Captain Murphy (AKA Flying Lotus). She also appeared in a commercial for the single on Adult Swim. Flying Lotus recorded the song as Captain Murphy for Adult Swim's Single Series.
 
In 2015, Violet Chachki was announced as a contestant on seventh season of RuPaul's Drag Race, after having unsuccessfully auditioned for season six. On the show, she was noted for excelling in fashion and design related challenges and her focus on aesthetics and confident demeanor. On June 1, 2015, she won the competition and received a cash prize of $100,000.

Chachki is known for her burlesque performances and aerial work, including aerial silk and aerial hoop. In January 2017, Dardo joined The Art of Teese, a neo-burlesque show headlined by Dita Von Teese.

In November 2017, she became the first drag queen in a major lingerie ad campaign, for the brand Bettie Page Lingerie.

In January 2018, she walked for Moschino in their Fall 2018 Collection at Milan Fashion Week.

In April 2019, she became the first international drag queen to have ever performed in India.

In May 2019, she attended the Met Gala, where the theme was Camp: Notes on Fashion, wearing a glove-shaped Moschino dress which was altered by Jeremy Scott. Thus, she became one of the first drag queens at the event, alongside Aquaria and RuPaul. In June 2019, a panel of judges from New York magazine placed Chachki 16th on their list of "the most powerful drag queens in America", a ranking of 100 former Drag Race contestants.

In November 2019, she teamed up with perfume brand Heretic Parfum as collaborator and muse for the genderless fragrance "Dirty Violet".

She is the fifth most followed queen from Drag Race, and has accumulated over 2 million Instagram followers as of October, 2021.

Music 
On June 2, 2015, Chachki released the lead single from their upcoming EP, "Bettie". Her debut EP Gagged was released on June 30, 2015. In May 2018, she released her fourth single, "A Lot More Me", a burlesque track independent from an album.

In July 2021, Chachki released the single "Mistress Violet" with pop singer Allie X. The song was produced by French producer Lecomte De Brégeot and written by Allie X. The accompanying 1980s influenced music video was shot on analog and features themes of power play and BDSM, with the two appearing in haute couture outfits by Schiaparelli. Chachki had previously appeared in Allie X's 2016 music video for "All The Rage".

Artistry 
Violet Chachki's style is characterized by her "obsession with vintage glamour". She has been referred to as "the living embodiment of a 1950s female archetype" and have cited designers Christian Dior, Thierry Mugler and John Galliano as inspirations, as well as "style icons" such as Lady Miss Kier, Dovima, Dita Von Teese, and Raquel Welch.

The influence of fetish fashion and art is a staple in Chachki's aesthetic, with references to the bondage and latex subcultures, John Willie's illustrations, dominatrix imagery and Bettie Page. They told Design Scene in 2016: "I think drag in itself is kind of a fetish, it’s kind of uncomfortable and I think bondage and latex are uncomfortable and they have that same feel... I think especially when you’re really feeling it and feeling your look and you’re willing to suffer through the pain to kind of present yourself the way you want to present... I think that’s kind of a fetish. I think it’s exhibitionism almost." Chachki is known for her tightly laced corsets.

Personal life
Born in Atlanta, Georgia, Dardo is half Ecuadorian.

Dardo is genderfluid and uses she/her and they/them pronouns.

Discography

EPs

As lead artist

As featured artist

Filmography

Films

Television

Web series

Music videos

Other appearances

Tours

Headlining 
 A Lot More Me (World, 2019–present)

Co-Headlining 
 RuPaul's Drag Race: Battle of the Seasons (World, 2015–2016) 
 Werq the World (World, 2017–2020)

References

External links
 
 

1992 births
Living people
LGBT people from Georgia (U.S. state)
American LGBT singers
Musicians from Atlanta
Non-binary musicians
Non-binary models
Violet Chachki
Hispanic and Latino American drag queens
American people of Ecuadorian descent
LGBT Hispanic and Latino American people
Non-binary drag performers
Genderfluid people